Paul Aaron Swannell (born 6 July 1980) is a former English cricketer. Swannell was a right-handed batsman who bowled right-arm off break.

Swannell made his List-A debut for Huntingdonshire in the 1999 NatWest Trophy against Bedfordshire.  He played one further match for Huntingdonshire in the 1st round of the 2003 Cheltenham & Gloucester Trophy which was played in 2002 against Cheshire.

In 2003 he joined Cambridgeshire, where he made his debut for the county in the 2003 Minor Counties Championship against Suffolk.  Swannell played 23 Minor Counties Championship matches for Cambridgeshire from 2003 to 2006.  In 2004 he represented Cambridgeshire in the 2004 Cheltenham & Gloucester Trophy against Northamptonshire, which was his only List-A match for the county.

In his 3 one-day matches, he scored 22 runs at a batting average of 7.33.  With the ball he took a single wicket at a bowling average of 110.00.

References

External links
Paul Swannell at Cricinfo
Paul Swannell at CricketArchive

1980 births
Sportspeople from Cambridge
English cricketers
Huntingdonshire cricketers
Cambridgeshire cricketers
Living people